Uganda toured Bermuda for an Intercontinental Shield match in August 2009.

Matches

Intercontinental Shield

2009 in Ugandan cricket
2009 in Bermudian cricket
International cricket competitions in 2009
2009